Bindo is an American technology company.

Bindo may also refer to:

 Bindo, Angola, town
 Jolee Bindo, fictional character
 Mount Bindo, mountain in Australia

People
 Bindo Altoviti (1491–1557), Italian banker 
 Bindo Jibrilla (born 1963), Nigerian businessman 
 Bindo Lanong (born 1976), Indian politician
 Bindo Maserati (1883–1980), Italian automotive engineer